Trinity Allen (born February 22, 2001) is an American karateka. She won the silver medal in the women's 55 kg event at the 2021 World Karate Championships held in Dubai, United Arab Emirates. In the semi-finals, she was injured by her opponent which left her unable to compete in the final and, as a result, she was awarded the silver medal. Two weeks later, she won the gold medal in her event at the 2021 Junior Pan American Games held in Cali, Colombia.

In October 2021, she won the gold medal in her event at the Pan American Senior Championships held in Punta del Este, Uruguay.

She won the bronze medal in the women's 55 kg event at the 2022 World Games held in Birmingham, United States.

References

External links 
 

Living people
2001 births
Sportspeople from Monroe, Louisiana
American female karateka
Competitors at the 2022 World Games
World Games bronze medalists
World Games medalists in karate
21st-century American women